Sorabe or Sora-be is an alphabet based on Arabic, formerly used to transcribe the Malagasy language (belonging to the Malayo-Polynesian language family) and the Antemoro Malagasy dialect, dating from the 15th century.

History
Researchers are still hypothesizing about the origins of this transcription system. "Sorabe" means literally "large writings" from Arabic "sura" (writing) and Malagasy "be" (large). This denomination might point to the existence of a previous writing system with smaller characters of Sanskrit origin used in South East Asia as it is evidenced in some Malagasy words.

Traditionally, researchers have speculated that this writing system was introduced through commercial contacts of Malagasy with Arab Muslims. However, more recent studies claim that this writing scheme might have been introduced by Javanese Muslims. There are striking similarities between "Sorabe" and "Pegon" writings (the Javanese version of Arabic script).

A couple of hundred old manuscripts have survived to this day though the oldest may have been written no earlier than the 17th century. Those "Sorabe" are bound in leather and the texts are named after the colour of the skin. Most of the texts contain magical formulas but there are also some historical texts concerning the origin of some of the tribes of the south east of Madagascar. These origins are traced to Mecca or the Prophet Mohammed even though the practice of Islam is nowhere seen in the texts.

Sorabe eventually spread across the island beginning in the 17th century and, at the end of the 18th century, the Merina king Andrianampoinimerina called for Antemoro scribes to teach the children of his court to read and write. This was how the future king Radama I learned to read and write in Sorabe from his childhood.

Nowadays Malagasy is written using a Latin alphabet, introduced in 1823.

Alphabet

See also
Madagascar
Malagasy

References

Bibliography
  Adelaar K.A. & Himmelmann N. (2004), The Austronesian Language of Asia and Madagascar, Routledge  .
  Ferrand, Gabriel (1905). Les migrations musulmanes et juives à Madagascar. Paris: Revue de l'histoire des religions.
  Kasanga Fernand (1990), Fifindra-monina, Librairie FLM, Antananarivo.
  Simon P. (2006) La langue des ancêtres. Ny Fitenin-drazana. Une périodisation du malgache des origines au XVe siècle, L'Harmattan .

External links
 La Case, les Sorabe, l'Histoire
 Arabic in Madagascar, Kees Versteegh, Bulletin of the School of Oriental and African Studies, 2001
 East Barito: Who Were the Malayo-Polynesian Migrants to Madagascar?

Malagasy language
Arabic alphabets
Writing systems of Africa